Baramulla railway station is situated in outskirts of baramulla town nearly about 5km from main town. Transport facility is available in working hours from main town baramulla to railway station and vice versa. It is the first station of 130 km long railway line which connects Kashmir Valley with Banihal. 

Baramulla is India's northernmost railway station.

History

The station has been built as part of the Jammu–Baramulla line megaproject, aiming to link the Kashmir Valley with the rest of the Indian railway network. The Leg 2 section of this network is incomplete. It is expected to be completed by 2021.

Reduced Level
The station is situated at an elevation of 1582.79 metres above mean sea level.

Design
Like every other station in this mega project, this station also features Kashmiri wood architecture, with an intended ambience of a royal court which is designed to complement the local surroundings to the station. Station signage is predominantly in Urdu, English and Hindi.

See also
Srinagar railway station
Anantnag railway station

References

Railway stations in Baramulla district
Railway stations opened in 2008
Firozpur railway division
Transport in Baramulla